is a former Japanese football player.

Playing career
Goto was born in Hiroshima Prefecture on December 24, 1969. After graduating from Tokai University, he joined Nagoya Grampus Eight in 1992. He played many matches as forward and offensive midfielder from first season. However he lost his opportunity to play in 1995 and he moved to JEF United Ichihara. However he could hardly play in the match in 1996. In 1997, he moved to Japan Football League club Sagan Tosu. He played for the club many matches in 2 seasons and retired end of 1998 season.

Club statistics

References

External links

1969 births
Living people
Tokai University alumni
Association football people from Hiroshima Prefecture
Japanese footballers
J1 League players
Japan Football League (1992–1998) players
Nagoya Grampus players
JEF United Chiba players
Sagan Tosu players
Association football midfielders